Lentner is an unincorporated community in southern Shelby County, Missouri, United States.   It is located on U.S. Route 36 about six miles west of Shelbina.

A post office called Lentner has been in operation since 1873. The community takes its name from Lentner Lathrop, an early settler.

References

Unincorporated communities in Shelby County, Missouri
Unincorporated communities in Missouri